Laubuka tenella is a species of small fish of the minnow and carp family, Cyprinidae, and the Danioninae subfamily. It was described in 2018 from specimens collected in the small streams of Cox's Bazar and Teknaf in Bangladesh and Thandwe river drainage in Western Myanmar.

Description
Body length is 42.1 mm SL. Body elongate and strongly compressed laterally. Eyes large. Barbels and tubercles absent. Scales cycloid, thin and transparent. Lab specimen are pale yellowish white with diffuse grey or black markings. Brown stripe found on dorsal midline. Thin black or brown stripe runs along middle of caudal peduncle. Fins hyaline.

References

Laubuka
Fish of Bangladesh
Taxa named by Sven O. Kullander
Fish described in 2018
Cyprinid fish of Asia